Plaza de toros de Quito is a bull ring in Quito, Ecuador.  It ceased to be used for bull fighting after a referendum in which the citizenry voted against such practice in the Quito district.  The stadium holds 15,000 people and it opened on 5 March 1960. 

Jipijapa metro station is nearby.

References

Buildings and structures completed in 1960
Quito
Sports venues in Quito